Antistathmoptera daltonae is a moth in the family Saturniidae described by Tams in 1935. It is found in Tanzania, Malawi, Mozambique, South Africa, Zimbabwe and Zambia.

Subspecies
Antistathmoptera daltonae daltonae (Tanzania)
Antistathmoptera daltonae granti Bouyer, 2006 (Tanzania)
Antistathmoptera daltonae rectangulata Pinhey, 1968 (Tanzania, Malawi, Mozambique, South Africa and Zimbabwe)

References

Saturniinae
Moths described in 1935
Moths of Africa